Kirill Sergeyevich Kopayev (born 8 January 1997) is a Russian football player.

Club career
He made his debut in the Russian Professional Football League for FC Sibir-2 Novosibirsk on 7 August 2018 in a game against FC Sakhalin Yuzhno-Sakhalinsk.

He made his Russian Football National League debut for FC Sibir Novosibirsk on 1 September 2018 in a game against FC Tambov.

References

External links
 Profile by Russian Professional Football League
 

1997 births
Sportspeople from Novosibirsk
Living people
Russian footballers
Association football defenders
FC Sibir Novosibirsk players